With a Smile is a 2013 Philippine television drama romantic comedy series broadcast by GMA Network. Directed by Louie Ignacio, it stars Andrea Torres, Christian Bautista and Mikael Daez. It premiered on June 24, 2013, on the network's morning line up. The series concluded on September 20, 2013, with a total of 65 episodes.

Cast and characters

Lead cast
 Andrea Torres as Patricia "Isay" Asuncion
 Christian Bautista as Aston Martinez
 Mikael Daez as Dean Vicencio

Supporting cast
 Marnie Lapuz as Mama Lena
 Soliman Cruz as Tomas "Tom" Asuncion
 Gilleth Sandico as Verci Asuncion
 Vince de Jesus as Teh
 Mikoy Morales as Mikoy
 Kimpoy Feliciano as Kimpoy
 Jak Roberto as Jak
 Shelly Hipolito as Sahsah
 Bryan Benedict as Athan
 RJ Padilla as Onyx
 Miggs Cuaderno as Budot

Guest cast
 Max Collins as Patricia
 Sam Pinto as Maricar

Production and development
The idea for the series first came from screenwriter Ma. Acy Ramos, who initially had the idea to create a light drama/romantic comedy series for GMA Network's Afternoon Prime block, which usually dominated by traditional "tearjerker" telenovelas. When she presented and discussed the idea to the management (GMA Entertainment TV Group), they immediately approved the project but decide to put it on morning time slot, instead, since they thought "it would fit best there." Director and screenwriter, Don Michael Perez began writing a script for a show now titled With a Smile, which somewhat patterned from the Korean television series Lovers in Paris but with a different angle—two men are fighting over a girl.

The network assigned Louie Ignacio to direct the series. The director described the show as "a mix of light drama, humor, charm and romance". Ignacio also regarded his main actors as part of the reasons he green-lighted directing the series. The casts were all announced during the series' story conference, with the main cast being Andrea Torres, Christian Bautista and Mikael Daez. The three actors were cast based on their auditions. Torres was chosen to play Isay Asuncion from more than 10 women who auditioned for the role. Torres shares certain similarities with her onscreen persona Isay, as they are both close to their families and determined to realize their dreams. Bautista, who played Aston Martinez, originally auditioned for the role of Dean Vicencio. Daez originally auditioned for Aston, but ended up portraying Dean Vicencio. Supporting casts include stage and TV actors Soliman Cruz, Gilleth Sandico and Marnie Lapuz; composer and comedian Vince de Jesus; and Protégé: The Battle For The Big Artista Break alumni Mikoy Morales, Shelly Hipolito and Bryan Benedict.

The production began in May 2013. Most of the scenes were shot on location in Quezon City. Some portions were shot in the town of Pampanga. The series' premiere was planned for June 17, but because of programming-related problems, it was delayed until June 24.

Ratings
According to AGB Nielsen Philippines' Mega Manila household television ratings, the pilot episode of With a Smile earned an 8.4% rating. While the final episode scored an 8.3% rating.

References

External links
 

2013 Philippine television series debuts
2013 Philippine television series endings
Filipino-language television shows
GMA Network drama series
Philippine romantic comedy television series
Television shows set in the Philippines